Darío Enrique Dubois (born 10 March 1971), better known as Darío Dubois, was an Argentine footballer famous for playing in numerous games with corpse-paint makeup. Due to this unusual characteristic, he became a famous and revered figure among those who like curious facts about football.

Professional career

In total, Dubois played 146 games and scored 13 goals for clubs in the Primera C and Primera D categories, fourth and fifth level of Argentine football respectively. He retired in 2005 after suffering a ligament injury in his knee and not earning enough money to perform the knee surgery.

Death

Dubois was shot twice on March 17, 2008 as he left a club where he worked as an audio operator. The causes have unfortunately never been clarified.

References

1971 births
2008 deaths
Association football defenders
Argentine footballers
Footballers from Buenos Aires
Deaths by firearm in Argentina
Male murder victims
People murdered in Argentina